Secret Society of Super Villains (SSoSV) is a DC Comics title that debuted in May–June 1976. The series presented a group of DC's supervillains, mostly foes of the Justice League of America. The series was cancelled with issue #15 in July 1978, as part of the DC Implosion, a period when DC suddenly cancelled dozens of comics.

In the decades following the cancellation of the original book, the fictional group has returned in many forms.

Series conception
Editor Gerry Conway created the team to be "a kind of 'evil' Justice League", inspired by the "Rogues Gallery" that fellow editor Julie Schwartz created for the Flash. Since other editors were somewhat possessive towards the more popular DC Comics supervillains, Conway resorted to sifting through DC's back issues in search of members, finally selecting a lineup of relatively obscure and/or forgotten villains. Conway said: "Obviously, this was lifted from Dick Tracy, but having costumed villains with a shared goal — even if it was simply the destruction of their common enemy — seems to be something that was unique to DC".

The first issue of Secret Society of Super Villains was drafted with artwork by Pablo Marcos. Then, according to Conway's assistant Paul Levitz:  In the original story, Darkseid (demanding to be called the Director) founds the group under the title of the Brotherhood of Crime in a bid to hold the world ransom by stealing the world's deadliest nerve gas. The group, made up of Captain Cold, Gorilla Grodd, Clayface, Star Sapphire, and a clone of the Manhunter, turns on their benefactor when the Manhunter raises the issue of Darkseid's history of trying to enslave humanity. Darkseid is revealed to be an android. The Manhunter suspects Darkseid controls it from afar and suggests forming the Secret Society of Super Villains to combat Darkseid while pursuing their own goals.

In the revised first issue, the team's lineup included Captain Cold, Gorilla Grodd, Star Sapphire and the Manhunter from the original conception, and added the Mirror Master, the Copperhead, Sinestro, the Shadow Thief and the Wizard.

Starting from the second issue, the comic's recurring hero is Captain Comet. Conway said that he wanted a regular 'lead hero' for the villains to interact with. The inclusion of a regular hero in the book helped to avoid Comics Code Authority concerns about presenting villains in a positive light.

Publication history
Due to the delays caused by having to redo the first issue from scratch, Conway assigned David Anthony Kraft to script the next three issues of Secret Society of Super Villains over his plots. After issue #4, both Conway and Kraft abruptly left DC, leading to a mad scramble to produce a fill-in issue.

Jack C. Harris took over as editor, and Conway returned as writer only with issue #8, but artists on the series rotated nearly as often as the lineup of the titular supergroup, with Rich Buckler, Mike Vosburg, and Dick Ayers all contributing short stints as pencilers, while inkers changed from issue to issue. Harris felt that the series' mediocre sales might have been partly his fault: "The cover concepts were one of my editorial duties. Rich Buckler turned my ideas into the best he could do, but I never felt as if my ideas were good enough for his art. I think there was a ‘sameness’ to my ideas which might have hurt the title in that casual readers might have missed buying an issue because they thought they’d already seen it".

Secret Society of Super Villains was cancelled with issue #15 as part of the DC Implosion. Issue #16 was already at the printer at the time of the cancellation and would have been the final issue, but writer Bob Rozakis appealed to DC to pull the issue since it was the beginning of a three-part story and he did not want to leave the readers hanging. Issue #17 was near completion at the time, and both it and issue #16 would see publication (of a sort) in the privately printed Cancelled Comics Cavalcade #2. Issue #18, which concluded the three-part story, was scripted but never drawn. Rozakis later revealed where the story would have gone had the series not been cancelled in a weekly column for Silver Bullet Comics.

This series, along with the unpublished issues #16 and 17, were collected in a two-volume hardcover edition, with the volumes published in 2011 and 2012, respectively.

Fictional history

Darkseid's Society

First organized by Darkseid, the Secret Society of Super Villains were based in the Sinister Citadel in San Francisco. From early on, the team was plagued with power struggles. Lex Luthor, the Wizard, Gorilla Grodd, and Funky Flashman all sought to control the powerful team; the Manhunter (the team's first leader) and Captain Comet, on the other hand, sought to divert the villains' evil ways into a more positive channel. After discovering the true identity of their benefactor, the team rebelled against the alien overlord. To quash their uprising, Darkseid sent Mantis and Kalibak. At the end of the struggle, the Manhunter sacrificed himself to seemingly kill Darkseid. After this, the team splintered, with Luthor, the Wizard, Gorilla Grodd and Flashman leading the team at different times. However, the Wizard proved to be the most tenacious and created the definitive incarnation of the SSoSV. They went on to fight the original Crime Syndicate of America of Earth-Three and the Justice Society of America. While traveling between dimensions, back on Earth-1 the Silver Ghost, the Mirror Master and the Copperhead formed yet another team and fought the Freedom Fighters.

The Wizard's group eventually returned from Earth-2 and battled against the Justice League of America aboard their satellite headquarters. At one point in the battle, the two teams swapped bodies, allowing the supervillains to discover the true identities of their enemies. After gaining the upper hand, the Justice League wiped the memories of the supervillains, precipitating Identity Crisis and the formation of the current Society years later.

Also notable in this series' run is the first appearance of Captain Comet in over 20 years, as well as the introduction of a new Star Sapphire. Both were regular, recurring characters.

The Ultra-Humanite's Society

The next incarnation of the Secret Society appeared in 1981, headquartered in a new Sinister Citadel in Nepal, and was created by the Ultra-Humanite, who organized foes of both Earth-One's Justice League and Earth-Two's Justice Society. This version of the Society consisted of the Ultra-Humanite, Brainwave I, Killer Frost I, the Cheetah II, the Signalman, the Floronic Man, the Monocle, the Rag Doll I, the Mist I, and the Psycho-Pirate II, and marked the first appearance of the now-classic albino ape body of the Ultra-Humanite. After capturing and sending 10 heroes of the JSA and JLA to Limbo, the Society was betrayed by the Ultra-Humanite, who had his own agenda. In response, the betrayed villains of Earth-1 freed the 10 heroes and attacked the Ultra-Humanite. The entire Secret Society of Super-Villains was incarcerated in Limbo by the JLA and JSA.

The Ultra-Humanite contacted his younger self in 1942, who helped to break out the SSoSV using the power of Brain Wave. The ape Ultra-Humanite attacked Infinity, Inc. in the modern day, while the rest of the SSoSV battled against the All-Star Squadron in 1942. The villains were defeated and returned to their proper times.

Underground
The SSoSV in time grew into a large underground group with dozens of villains holding membership in various scattered cells. After the reformation of the JLA, the seven superheroes decided to infiltrate and shut down this new Society. Disguising himself as the deceased Brain Wave, Martian Manhunter lured the villains to one spot where they were defeated by the JLA. As the tale was told by the Rainbow Raider to Sonar III, it is uncertain whether this tale actually happened. At the very least, there may have been some embellishment.

Alexander Luthor Jr.'s Society
After the defeat of the last incarnation of the SSoSV, a great amount of time would pass before villains would band together in any sort of large organization. Fueled by rumors of the mindwiping of Dr. Light, a new Society emerged. This Society was founded by Alexander Luthor Jr. posing as Lex Luthor, along with five other supervillains: the Calculator, Doctor Psycho, Deathstroke the Terminator, Talia al Ghul, and Black Adam.

Alexander Luthor Jr.'s intent was to gather together a cadre of supervillains to retrieve several key superheroes who have ties to the Multiverse, in order to harness their residual temporal vibrations to recreate the Multiverse through a giant "tuning fork" tower similar to the ones seen in Crisis on Infinite Earths. Only the Psycho-Pirate II, who remembered the Multiverse, knew of this plan, as Alexander Luthor Jr. lied to the members of his inner circle, telling them that he was building a massive mind-erasing machine to use against all of the heroes in the DC Universe.

Playing on the fear of superheroes, retaliation for refusal, and the desire for power, Alexander created a Society the size of which (over 500 members) is larger than all previous incarnations combined. Out of all the villains in the DC Universe, the only one not even offered an invitation was the Joker on the grounds that he was "too wild".

The group, referred to simply as the Society, was featured in the miniseries Villains United as background characters and foils for the new Secret Six (consisting of six villains recruited by the real Lex Luthor, who refused their invitation to join the Society). The follow-up one-shot issue Villains United: Infinite Crisis Special #1 focused on the Society itself as they enacted Alexander Luthor Jr.'s back-up plan to conquer Earth in the event that his main plan failed. This led to a final battle, referred to as the Battle of Metropolis, where the Society, led by Doctor Psycho and Doomsday, made their final battle against the various heroes of the DC Universe.

At the end of Infinite Crisis, Alexander Luthor Jr. was killed by the Joker (as his revenge on Alexander Luthor Jr. for not including him in the Society), who was brought to him by Lex Luthor. Black Adam, betrayed by Alexander Luthor Jr., fought the Society in the Battle of Metropolis, tearing off Amazo's head, and returned to Khandaq to rule full-time.

One Year Later

One Year Later, most of the Society's inner circle is either in prison or has resigned from the group. Doctor Psycho was captured by the authorities after the Battle of Metropolis and is on trial in the Manhunter series; he has also appeared in Secret Six and Wonder Woman. Deathstroke the Terminator was apprehended by the Green Arrow, but escaped and started recruiting members for the Titans East.

With Talia returning to rule the League of Assassins, the Calculator remains the only original member of the "inner council" left running the Society.

Final Crisis

Not long after the Society's dissolution, Checkmate instigated a crackdown on all villains in the DC Universe, who were captured and exiled to a prison planet as seen in the Salvation Run miniseries. The group included almost every villain in the DC universe, with rare exceptions. Though the villains escaped back to Earth, their desire for revenge drives the Society to depose Lex Luthor and replace him with a leader who promises them what they desire...the mysterious Libra.

Libra, a follower of Intergang's "Religion of Crime" and secretly an agent of Darkseid, leads the Secret Society in their role as Darkseid's ground troops as part of the Final Crisis storyline. Promising to fulfill the hearts desires of his subordinates, Libra murders the Martian Manhunter for new recruit the Human Flame. He also arranges for Clayface to cause an explosion at the Daily Planet, killing and maiming dozens of Superman's closest friends and mortally wounding his wife Lois in the process, to try to seduce the disgruntled Luthor to his side and draw Superman to Libra.

With most of the Society, including Vandal Savage, behind him, Libra reveals his true self to Lex Luthor as the villain turns on the Human Flame by forcing a mind-control helmet onto the villain's face, exposing him to the Anti-Life Equation and turning him into a mindless slave warrior known as a Justifier. Faced with the threat of being forced to become a Justifier himself, Luthor agrees to become Libra and Darkseid's servant. With help from Doctor Sivana and the Calculator, Lex Luthor ultimately turns against Libra and forces him to retreat. With Sivana's help, Luthor and the mind-controlled legions of Justifiers helped Superman in battle against the last remaining forces of Darkseid, the Fury Riders. Luthor and Sivana then proceed to help Superman build the Miracle Machine to save the Earth, though the two are only allowed to work on sections of the machine due to the risk of them stealing the designs for future villainous schemes.

In Final Crisis: Revelations, the third Spectre kills Doctor Light and melts the Effigy before trying to take on Libra. Sister Wrack of the Religion of Crime impales Vandal Savage with the Spear of Destiny, causing Vandal Savage to be reborn as Cain. Cain then seeks out the Spectre and easily overwhelms him, followed by Cain impaling the Spectre with the Spear of Destiny. It separates the Spectre from host Crispus Allen as Renee Montoya and Radiant carry his body into the church. Cain later controls the Spectre and has it recite the Anti-Life Equation to recreate the world in Darkseid's name. Cain manages to stab Renee with the Spear of Destiny. Renee manages to grab the Spear and use its powers to restore the world and Crispus' life. Reuniting with the Spectre, Crispus uses his judgement to kill Cain's followers, but could not kill Cain. The Spectre casts Cain out into the world with no chance of peace until God decides to grant him otherwise.

In Final Crisis: Rogues' Revenge, the Rogues withdraw from Libra's Society and plot to take revenge on a movement-restored Inertia before they retire. However, Libra uses his New Rogues to target the Rogues and forces them to join up with Libra by doing various things to those close to them. Even with the New Rogues slain by the Rogues, Libra does not give up that easily. They still turn down Libra even after Zoom is de-powered by Inertia, who is then killed by the Rogues.

From an idea by T. O. Morrow during and after Final Crisis, the Cheetah III assigned several scientific members of a new Secret Society (such as Professor Ivo and Doctor Poison) to collect soil samples from various regions of Earth in which acts of genocide occurred. They plan to use the soil to form a new villain named Genocide. Genocide is brought to life through a combination of science and the magic of Felix Faust. They are successful in doing so, but soon after an enraged Wonder Woman defeats a small team of members consisting of Shrapnel, the Firefly, Phobia and T. O. Morrow. After telling them to disband the team, Wonder Woman then destroys their home base skyscraper building.

The New 52
In September 2011, The New 52 rebooted DC's continuity. In this new timeline, the Secret Society's origins are traced to two shadowy figures (one of whom is later revealed to be Professor Ivo) who meet to discuss the growing superhero community. The Secret Society is officially uncovered five years later by the Green Arrow, who is injured while trying to infiltrate the organization under the name the Dark Hunter on behalf of the Justice League of America (at that time, a state-sponsored group, separate from the Justice League led by Superman). The mysterious leader of the Secret Society, originally only known as "the Outsider", spreads out photographs of the different supervillains in front of him and says "It's recruitment time starting with Scarecrow". The mysterious leader successfully convinces the Scarecrow to join the Secret Society. The Justice League of America sends the Catwoman to infiltrate the Secret Society by sending her to Arkham Asylum and then letting her escape. When she does, she runs into the Blockbuster I and the Signalman on the rooftops, where she ends up knocked out and wakes up strapped to a chair in an empty room. While waiting for a meeting with the leader of the Secret Society, the Catwoman frees herself from the chair that she was strapped to. When the Catwoman meets with Professor Ivo, who plans to bring her to the banquet hall to meet the leader of the Secret Society, she knocks out Professor Ivo, only for her to be strangled into unconsciousness by the Copperhead moments later. The Catwoman wakes up strapped to the chair again, with a pale man clad in purple standing in front of her. He demands to know what she and her friends are doing there. He is aware of the Justice League of America's encounter with the Shaggy Man (this version being created by Professor Ivo) and Dr. Light's attempts to access their communication systems. He warns that Arthur Light is about to receive an unpleasant call. As Arthur Light begins hearing a voice from the object, the pale man puts a gun to the Catwoman's head and orders her to start talking. Instead, she warns that if he kills her, the Batman will stop at nothing to find them. This, however, is exactly what the Secret Society wants. Dr. Light is suddenly knocked back by a burst of light, just as the pale man pulls the trigger, leaving the Catwoman apparently dead on the floor of the concrete room. The Secret Society's leader has the Signalman and the Copperhead drop off the Catwoman's body at the Batman's doorstep. The Catwoman soon comes back to life and it is discovered that the Catwoman present is actually the Martian Manhunter in disguise. The Martian Manhunter and the Catwoman then fight the Outsider and the Blockbuster. When the Manhunter and the Catwoman finish with the Blockbuster, they hunt down the Outsider, who seems to know all about their real identities, but his identity is still a mystery to them. The Martian Manhunter attempts to use his telepathy to discover it, but he senses he is blocked from doing so. Despite that, the Outsider allows the Martian Manhunter the opportunity to see into his mind. The Martian Manhunter is surprised to learn this man watched his world die as he did. While pursuing Professor Ivo, the Green Arrow finds him in a room with the captive A.R.G.U.S. agent Chronos trapped in a chair with electric energy. When the engine he is stuck in is activated (and it has just been) Chronos causes a temporal neutral field to envelope the manor, causing it to freeze in place throughout time, while Earth turns...which means Earth moves, not the manor. Thanks to the coins the Society have been given, they are able to stay within the manor without issue, but the Justice League of America will face a very painful death if they do not leave the house soon. After the Justice League of America escape from the manor, the Outsider comments to the Martian Manhunter that it was nice to see him "again".

At the start of the "Trinity War" storyline, the Outsider has sent Plastique to prevent Madame Xanadu from warning the Justice League of her vision. The Outsider states that Pandora will soon be in the clutches of the Secret Society of Super Villains. The Outsider calls his fellow members telling them "it's time". Madame Xanadu is revealed to have been captured by the Outsider, who tells her that the Justice Leagues and the Trinity of Sin are all pieces in his game, with Superman and the Question (referred to as the pawns), the Batman, the Phantom Stranger, and Wonder Woman (referred to as the knights), all moving away from Pandora (referred to as the queen), leaving her unprotected. Madame Xanadu retorts that she does not need to see the future to know that the Justice League will defeat him. The Outsider replies that he has already won, since he has a mole in the Justice League. The Outsider orders Plastique to infiltrate A.R.G.U.S. to plant a bomb on Doctor Light's body. It is revealed at the end of the storyline that the Outsider is actually the Alfred Pennyworth of Earth-3 and he uses Pandora's Box to open a gateway to allow the Crime Syndicate of America to arrive on Prime Earth. The formation of the Secret Society was to have members ready for the Crime Syndicate once they arrived.

During the "Forever Evil" storyline, the Crime Syndicate furthers their goals by springing inmates from Arkham Asylum, Belle Reve Penitentiary, and Iron Heights Penitentiary in order to expand the Secret Society of Super Villains and establish their rule over this reality.

DC Rebirth
The Society reappears in DC Rebirth, where its members consist of Vandal Savage, Hector Hammond, the Riddler, Professor Zoom the Reverse-Flash, Black Manta, the Ultra-Humanite, Deadline, the Raptor, and Killer Frost, with Lex Luthor being established as a former member. They place Deathstroke the Terminator on trial while debating whether he is truly reformed or not; however, the Riddler proves via Hammond's telepathic abilities that Deathstroke is 'evil'.

Members

Other versions

Justice Underground

The Justice Underground is a fictional superhero team in the DC Multiverse. The Justice Underground is an alternative version of the Secret Society of Super Villains from the Anti-Matter Universe.

Fictional history
The Underground experienced some temporary victories in their battles with the Syndicate, both as a team and individually. For example, the Quizmaster's underground connections allowed him to interfere with the supplies needed by the Crime Syndicate for various operations, such as the speed serum that Johnny Quick requires to maintain his super speed.

One by one, the Justice Underground members were all defeated, captured or killed. For example, Ultraman (the antimatter Superman) rendered Sir Solomon Grundy inert on a Saturday, and Lady Sonar sustained massive injuries from having her sonic abilities reflected back to her by Power Ring (the antimatter Green Lantern). Lady Sonar was forced to replace much of her shattered body with bionic implants. It was in this form that she resided as the guardian of Modora, the final free nation of the Anti-Matter Earth.

Upon her home's invasion, Lady Sonar was successful in defeating Johnny Quick (the antimatter Flash) by temporarily shifting his body out of phase with reality. She was eventually destroyed by the Owlman (the antimatter Batman) and the rest of the Crime Syndicate when they finally conquered Modora. Lady Sonar was placed into cryogenic storage alongside her teammates, ready to be reanimated in a zombified state if the Syndicate decides it necessary. Their remains are located in the Crime Syndicate's Panopticon on the Moon's surface.

The Justice Underground was released by the Martian Manhunter as a team of associate JLA members reversed back into the matter universe. It is unclear how they were able to recover from their injuries, though it could be inferred that the Owlman healed their injuries while they were in stasis.

Members
 Quizmaster (the antimatter Riddler) –  Arthur Brown was a master quiz show host until he lost and turned to crime.The Quizmaster is the leader and the smartest man alive. He does not have any superpowers. His incredibly high IQ and knowledge of almost all disciplines enabled him to be as effective a fighter as any of his compatriots with superpowers. Quizmaster later adopted the alias of Enigma.
 Sir Solomon Grundy (the antimatter Solomon Grundy) – Cyrus Gold was a Gotham city merchant, until he was killed in a swamp and became a Hulk like zombie Sir Solomon Grundy is a distinguished, poised mountain of a man. During an aerial bombardment of Dover, he was blasted to life out of the white rock. Sir Solomon appears to be identical in physical appearance to Solomon Grundy, with the exception of a trimmed mustache and a small goatee. In keeping with his educated personality, Sir Solomon dresses himself as a 19th-century Englishman would and speaks accordingly. His super strength and invulnerability made him a formidable hero.
 General Grodd (the antimatter Gorilla Grodd) – General Grodd is a renegade freedom fighter from a militaristic ape nation. Grodd is an extremely strong gorilla who has telekinesis, and smarts to match his strength.
 Star Sapphire (the antimatter Star Sapphire) – This version of Star Sapphire is a knight-errant from the other side of the galaxy. Star Sapphire is a Violet Lantern ( Powered by love) and will do anything for it.
 Lady Sonar (the antimatter Sonar) – Lady Sonar is a female version of Sonar.
 Q Ranger (the antimatter Major Force) – The "quantum-powered dynamo".

Collected editions
The original comic book series was scheduled to be collected into a trade paperback entitled Showcase Presents The Secret Society of Super Villains (collects SSoSV #1–17, 520 pages), but that project was cancelled. Instead, it was collected into two hardcover volumes. They are:
 The Secret Society of Super Villains Volume 1 (collects SSoSV #1–10), August 2011, .
 The Secret Society of Super Villains Volume 2 (collects SSoSV #11–15, DC Special #27, DC Special Series #6, Super-Team Family #13–14, Justice League of America #166–168 and the unpublished SSoSV #16–17 from Cancelled Comics Cavalcade #2), March 2012,

In other media

Television
 The Secret Society appear in series set in the DC Animated Universe (DCAU):
 In a self-titled Justice League two-part episode, Gorilla Grodd, Giganta, Killer Frost, Sinestro, the Parasite, the Shade, and Clayface form the eponymous group. While doing so, Grodd takes pains to encourage a more cohesive organization in order to avoid the infighting of Lex Luthor's Injustice Gang. The Society defeat the Justice League in their first encounter, but are defeated in the subsequent rematch.
 In the third season of Justice League Unlimited, Grodd rebuilds and expands the Secret Society to combat the expanded Justice League by recruiting Luthor, most of his original Society save for Clayface, Angle Man, Atomic Skull, Bizarro, Blockbuster, Bloodsport, the Cheetah, Copperhead, the Cadre, Devil Ray, Doctor Cyber, Doctor Destiny, Doctor Polaris, Doctor Spectro, Dummy, Electrocutioner, Evil Star, Gentleman Ghost, Goldface, Heat Wave, Hellgrammite, Javelin, Key, KGBeast, Lady Lunar, Livewire, Major Disaster, Merlyn, Metallo, Mirror Master, Monocle, Neutron, Psycho-Pirate, Puzzler, Puppeteer, Queen Bee, Rampage, Shark, Silver Banshee, Sonar, Sportsmaster, Star Sapphire, Tala, Tattooed Man, the Thinker, the Top, Toyman, Tsukuri, Volcana, and Weather Wizard. With this incarnation of the Society, Grodd created a massive co-operative wherein he manages its members and they provide backup for each other in exchange for Grodd receiving a cut of any profits made. To keep anyone from discovering the Society, all members have their brains shielded from telepathy and wired to short out in case anyone is captured and forced to reveal information on the group. After discovering Grodd was using the Society to turn humanity into apes, Luthor ousts him and assumes leadership. In the two-part series finale "Alive!" and "Destroyer", Luthor has the Society convert their headquarters into a spaceship in an attempt to resurrect Brainiac. While en route however, Grodd joins forces with Tala to lead a coup and retake control, leading to a civil war until the latter jettisons the former into space and Killer Frost freezes Grodd's loyalists just as they reach the site of Brainiac's defeat. There, Luthor forces Tala to restore him, but she resurrects Darkseid instead. He rewards Luthor by destroying the Society's base, though Sinestro and Star Sapphire rescue Luthor, Atomic Skull, Bizarro, Cheetah, Evil Star, Giganta, Heat Wave, Killer Frost, Toyman, and Volcana. They rob Lightray of his Mother Box and return to Earth to warn the Justice League of Darkseid's return before joining forces with them to stop him.
 Additionally, the episode "Epilogue" includes a futuristic incarnation of the Secret Society known as the Iniquity Collective, consisting of Inque, Shriek, Stalker, and a monstrous future incarnation of the Parasite.
 The Justice Underground appears in the Batman: The Brave and the Bold episode "Deep Cover for Batman!", led by the Red Hood and consisting of unnamed heroic versions of Black Manta, the Clock King, Doctor Polaris, the Gentleman Ghost, Gorilla Grodd, Sinestro, the Brain, and Kite Man. After a battle with the Injustice Syndicate, most of the group was captured, but the Red Hood contacts Batman's world to look for new allies. Batman soon arrives and helps free the heroes before helping them capture the Injustice Syndicate.
 In Young Justice, a group of villains called The Light have similarities and motives comparable to those of the Secret Society as they implement plans to make the people of Earth "see the light". The group was founded by Vandal Savage to counteract the Justice League's preserving of society's "calcified status quo", believing they directly inhibit mankind by protecting them from disaster, crime and tragedy — factors needed for humanity to evolve. To counteract this, the Light works to create or co-opt networks of recruited operatives, place various key individuals into key positions, and explore the boundaries of any and all new technologies across the globe. This enables them to expose humankind to the aforementioned factors to allow them to accelerate human evolution with as little resistance as possible from the League. In season one, the Light consists of Savage, Ra's al Ghul, Lex Luthor, Queen Bee, Ocean Master, the Brain, and Klarion the Witch Boy, with Sportsmaster serving as their enforcer. In season two, Black Manta and Deathstroke replace Ocean Master and Sportsmaster respectively while the Reach and Darkseid become their silent partners, though the Light allow the former to be defeated by the Team by the end of the season. In season three, Deathstroke, the Ultra-Humanite, and Granny Goodness have replaced Ra's Al Ghul, the Brain, and Black Manta respectively while Lady Shiva takes Deathstroke's place. Near the end of the season however, Granny helps Darkseid act against the Light to fulfill his ultimate goal of acquiring the Anti-Life Equation and spreading his influence across the universe. Despite Savage helping the Team locate Granny, she uses the Equation to brainwash them and a majority of the Justice League before using it on the universe until Victor Stone and the Outsiders help free the brainwashed heroes and foil Granny's plan. Following this, the Light and Darkseid seemingly agree to reconcile their partnership, though Savage secretly confirms Darkseid as a potential threat. By the end of the season, Markovian ambassador Zviad Baazovi replaces Granny, using his psionic powers to assist the Light in future endeavors.

Film
The Justice Underground appears in Justice League: Crisis on Two Earths. The group consists of a heroic Lex Luthor and the Jester, along with his monkey sidekick Harley. After the Jester sacrifices himself to kill two Crime Syndicate members, Luthor evades the Syndicate's leaders and flees to the Justice League's Earth to seek out their help.

Video games
 The Secret Society appears in DC Universe Online, led by Lex Luthor, Circe, and the Joker and affiliated with various villains/groups throughout the game.
 An alternate reality version of the Secret Society of Super Villains simply called the "Society" appears in Injustice 2. Led by Gorilla Grodd, the group consists of Bane, Poison Ivy, the Scarecrow, Deadshot, the Cheetah, Captain Cold, and the Reverse-Flash. Although Catwoman was originally considered one of its members, she is later revealed to be a double agent working for Batman's Insurgency. The "Society" intend to fill the power void left by the Justice League and Insurgency defeating High Councillor Superman and his Regime, though Grodd is secretly in league with Brainiac to help him destroy the Earth. Once the other members discover this however, they disband the group.

Miscellaneous
A team based on the Justice Underground called the Brotherhood of Justice appears in issue #48 of Teen Titans Go!, consisting of alternate reality, heroic versions of General Immortus, Psimon, Mammoth, Doctor Light, and Madame Rouge, with Rouge serving as a double agent within the Teen Tyrants, posing as Blackfire. After the Teen Titans are defeated by their evil counterparts, Rouge reveals herself and brings in the rest of the Brotherhood to defeat the Teen Tyrants.

References

External links
Secret Society of Super-Villains (DC, 1976 series) at the Grand Comics Database
Secret Society of Super-Villains at Don Markstein's Toonopedia. Archived from the original on May 19, 2017.
 Secret Society of Super Villains at Comic Vine

1976 comics debuts
1976 comics endings
Villains in animated television series
Characters created by Gerry Conway
Comic book terrorist organizations
Comics characters introduced in 1976
DC Comics supervillain teams
DC Comics titles
Fictional secret societies
Supervillain comics